Twproject (say: T W Project) is a web-based project and groupware management tool created by Open Lab, an Italian software house founded in 2001. It won the 17th Jolt Productivity Award in 2007 in the project management category. In March 2019 it becomes property of Twproject company. It has widespread use in universities as a teaching tool in project management courses. It is used by Oracle Corporation, Prada, Calzedonia, General Electric and many other companies from corporations to small start-ups.

History
 April 2001 - The idea of Teamwork came to Open-Lab founders from a need to overcome the PM tools used at that time. It was built in Microsoft ASP and Adobe Flash
 November 2002 - Open-Lab decide to move from Flash to HTML and from ASP to Java-JSP. Teamwork 2 development is started.
 June 2004 - Teamwork 2 released, using top open-source technologies like Hibernate, jBlooming, dynamic CSS, Ajax 
 7 January 2005 - Teamwork goes open source, under LGPL license; remains such until June 2006 (18 months): it is a hit application on SourceForge, with 38.000 downloads, covered by greeting but starving
 April 2005 - Open-Lab takes the decision to change commercial strategy to finance development of Teamwork version 3 
 6 June 2006 - Teamwork 3 is finally out (15 months development). New interface, many new features, agile support and much more
 27 March 2007 - Teamwork wins the 2007 JOLT Productivity Awards for project management category
 July 2007 - Teamwork 4 development started: new interface, extended use of new HTML capabilities, JS-oriented interface, start using jQuery
 February 2009 - Teamwork 4.0 is out
 February 2010 - Teamwork 4.4: public project pages, Chinese interface. jQuery is getting more space in Teamwork
 December 2010 - Teamwork 4.6: released Mobile module available for iPhone, Android, BlackBerry. Intensive usage of jQuery 
 June 2011 - Teamwork 4.7: released Issue Kanban / Organizer 
 January 2012 - Teamwork 5.0 development started. Lighter interface, extensive usage of dynamic pages, easier installer and first time approach. Learning curve highly reduced. A jQuery Gantt editor included and released free for the community
 July 2012 - Teamwork 5 released and also the free online Gantt editor
 November 2012 - Teamwork 5.1 with new trees and improved model for staffing
 March 2013 - Teamwork 5.2 with stronger support for customizations and Japanese interface.
 April 2014 - Teamwork has changed its name in Twproject because the domain teamwork.com has been purchased by Teamwork.
 April 2013 - Twproject 5.4 with a redesigned more powerful Gantt chart.
 August 2015 - Twproject 5 finale release.
 September 2015 - Twproject 6 with a completely redesigned user interface.
 March 2019 - A new company Twproject srl has been spun off. 
 September 2021 - Twproject 7 has been released introducing WBS based management and workload management.

Features
 Project & task management (with Microsoft Project import/export), and JSON format
 Gantt editor. Uses jQuery Gantt components
 Time tracking. Several entry points: dashboard, weekly view, issues, start/stop buttons
 Resource planning with weekly/monthly view, work load overview, unavailability from agenda
 Issue tracking & planning(with Kanban), e-mail integration, task dedicated inboxes 
 Dashboard configuration, with customizable portlets and layout
 Message boards
 Scrum module
 Meeting and minute management, attached documents
 Agenda (Integrates with iCal, Microsoft Outlook, Microsoft Entourage, and Google Calendar)
 Document management, remote file systems link with NTFS, FTP, SVN, S3 (Dropbox, Google drive)
 Mobile application for iPhone, iPad, Android, Blackberry, Windows phone

Integration
A complete JSON API is available for integrations.
The applications runs in Java JDK 8+ on the Hibernate object/relational mapping.

The standard distribution uses Apache Tomcat 9, but can run on any J2EE application server.
Twproject is tested on these DB servers: MySQL, Oracle, SQL Server, PostgreSql, HSQLDB, but as uses Hibernate can run on many others.
There is simple graphical step-by-step installer for Windows, Mac, Linux, .zip/.tar.gz/.rpm packages.

See also
 Comparison of time-tracking software
 Comparison of project-management software

References

External links
 Twproject website
 Twproject blog
 Gantt
 Twproject support
 Open Lab website

Project management software
Web applications